Gabriele Weller (born 2 February 1976) is a German gymnast. She competed in six events at the 1992 Summer Olympics.

References

External links
 

1976 births
Living people
German female artistic gymnasts
Olympic gymnasts of Germany
Gymnasts at the 1992 Summer Olympics
Sportspeople from Giessen